The Worshipful Company of Scriveners is one of the 110 livery companies of the City of London. The Scriveners Company was originally known as the Mysterie of the Writers of the Court Letter and, since its incorporation, as Master Wardens and Assistants of the Company of Scrivenors of the Cittie of London . It is one of the few livery companies that from its foundation to the present day has been influential in setting the standards for a living profession, namely that of scrivener notary. The company's first ordinances were granted in 1373. Its royal charter was granted by King James I on 28 January 1617.

Historically, scrivener notaries were the only notaries public permitted to practise in the City of London, the Liberties of Westminster, The Borough (Southwark), and other places within three miles from the City. In 1801, Parliament passed the Public Notaries Act that confirmed this status.

Scrivener notaries are only appointed after a two-year apprenticeship to a practising scrivener notary and sitting the examinations set by the company. They must be fluent in one or two foreign languages and be familiar with the principles and practice of foreign laws. The ancient privilege of scrivener notaries was extinguished by the Access to Justice Act 1999, since when any notary public qualified to practise in England and Wales may practise within the company's former exclusive jurisdiction. Nonetheless, they remain a discrete branch of the profession and their unique status is recognised in civil-law countries by their membership in the International Union of Notaries (UINL). Current qualification rules were adopted by the court of the company in 1998.

In addition to the scrivener notaries, the membership of the company comprises those with qualifications and interests in the fields of calligraphy, heraldry, genealogy, wider aspects of the law, authorship, accountancy, and business.

Admission to the Freedom and Livery is, as with other livery companies, via one of three possible routes: redemption, patrimony or servitude. Each applicant has to be proposed by two liverymen, one of whom must be a member of the court, or by authority of the Selection Committee. Women were first admitted to the company in 1665.

Also, as with many other livery companies, its principal activities divide into four areas: professional, charitable, civic, and social. Its charitable activities are governed by its Sexcentenary Charity Fund.

In the order of precedence of the City livery companies, the Scriveners Company ranks forty-fourth. Its motto is Scribite Scientes, Latin for Write, Ye Learned Ones. The Master is head of the company and its membership comprises Wardens, Assistants, Liverymen, Freemen and Apprentices.

The Scriveners Company has produced two Lord Mayors of the City of London: Sir Robert Clayton in 1680 and Sir James Shaw in 1805. The Scriveners' Hall was burned down in the Great Fire of London (1666), and rebuilt thereafter. However, for financial reasons the company had to sell the hall to the Worshipful Company of Coachmakers and Coach Harness Makers in 1703. It was demolished again in the Blitz. The site of the hall is in Noble Street, just off Gresham Street, near Guildhall.

Modern status of scrivener notaries 
There are six firms of scrivener notaries active in the City of London: Cheeswrights, De Pinna, John Newton & Sons, John Venn & Sons, Saville & Co. and Imison & Co. The Worshipful Company of Scriveners is the only body from a common-law jurisdiction to have been accepted to the International Union of Notaries.

References

External links
 The Scriveners' Company
 Scriveners' Company Common Paper: a full-text edition of the principal record of the company from 1357 to 1678 (originally published by the London Record Society (1968, ed. Francis W. Steer), included as part of British History Online).
Scriveners' Company coat of arms

Livery companies
1373 establishments in England
Notary
Corporatism
History of the City of London